The Cruls Islands or Crulls Islands are a group of small islands lying  west of the Roca Islands in the southern part of the Wilhelm Archipelago. They were discovered by the Belgian Antarctic Expedition, 1897–99, and named by Gerlache for Luís Cruls (also known as Louis Crulls), a Belgian astronomer and later Director of the Observatory at Rio de Janeiro.

See also 
 List of Antarctic and sub-Antarctic islands
 Luis Cruls

References 

Islands of the Wilhelm Archipelago